Four-Calendar Café is the seventh studio album by Scottish band Cocteau Twins, released on 18 October 1993 by Fontana Records.

Background
The album distinguishes itself from the rest of the Twins' catalogue in two major areas: The sound is much more pop-oriented and less ambient than previous works, and vocalist Elizabeth Fraser's lyrics are more intelligible than usual. Their single "Evangeline" was a moderate hit in several countries. "Bluebeard" was a moderate success on the United States modern charts.

Title and artwork
The album took its title from William Least Heat-Moon's book Blue Highways, in which the author considers the quality of a restaurant by how many calendars it has hanging on its wall.  NME named it the 46th best record of 1993.

The cover image was taken by Walter Wick, who is known for his photography for the children's book series I Spy. The picture is a set of various small objects scattered across a dark blue background. Inside the booklet, the objects are scattered across a white background.

Release and promotion 

To promote the album, Robin Guthrie appeared on MTV's 120 Minutes, marking the first television interview by a member of the band in the United States. As part of the promotion, the band performed "Bluebeard" on The Tonight Show with Jay Leno.

Sales
As of 1996, it had sold 146,000 copies in the U.S. according to Nielsen SoundScan.

Track listing
All songs written by Cocteau Twins.
"Know Who You Are at Every Age" – 3:42
"Evangeline" – 4:31
"Bluebeard" – 3:56
"Theft, and Wandering Around Lost" – 4:30
"Oil of Angels" – 4:38
"Squeeze-Wax" – 3:49
"My Truth" – 4:34
"Essence" – 3:02
"Summerhead" – 3:39
"Pur" – 5:02

Personnel
Elizabeth Fraser - vocals
Robin Guthrie - guitar
Simon Raymonde - bass

Additional personnel
Lincoln Fong - additional engineering

Cover versions
The songs "Bluebeard" and "Know Who You Are at Every Age" were covered by Cantopop artist Faye Wong for her 1994 album Wu Si Lyun Seung or Random Thoughts. "Bluebeard" was renamed to become the album's title track, and "Know Who You Are at Every Age" became "Ji Gei Ji Bei" (or "Know Yourself and Each Other"). Wong's cover version of "Bluebeard" was featured in the film Chungking Express, in which she also starred.

Charts

References

Cocteau Twins albums
1993 albums
Fontana Records albums